Samuel Evans (8 February 1904 – ?) was a Scottish professional footballer who played as an outside forward in Scottish football for Clydebank (two spells) and St Mirren, in the Football League for Reading, York City and Darlington, in non-League football for Scarborough and in Irish football for Ballymena.

Footnotes

References

1904 births
Footballers from Glasgow
Year of death missing
Scottish footballers
Association football forwards
St Mirren F.C. players
Clydebank F.C. (1914) players
Reading F.C. players
York City F.C. players
Scarborough F.C. players
Darlington F.C. players
Scottish Football League players
English Football League players